The ladies' single figure skating competition of the 2018 Winter Olympics was held at the Gangneung Ice Arena in Gangneung, South Korea. The short program was held on 21 February, and the free skating was held on 23 February.

Records

For a complete list of figure skating records, see list of highest scores in figure skating.

The following new best scores were set during this competition:

The Olympic Athletes from Russia set two subsequent world records in the short program on February 21, with Evgenia Medvedeva scoring 81.61 and then Alina Zagitova scoring 82.92 ten minutes later.

Qualification 

A total of 30 skaters qualified to compete in the event, with each country allowed to only enter a maximum of three. 24 quotas were handed out during the 2017 World Figure Skating Championships and the remaining six were given out at the 2017 CS Nebelhorn Trophy. Each country decided the entry of its teams, and athletes winning the quota were not necessarily granted the right to compete. All athletes competing must have met the minimum total elements score, which does not include component scores. For the short program this was 20.00 and the free skate 36.00.

Schedule 
All times are (UTC+9).

Results

Short program 
The short program was held on 21 February.

Free skating 
The free skating was held on 23 February.

* Evgenia Medvedeva finished at higher place due to better program component score

Overall 
The skaters were ranked according to their overall score.

TP - Total points; SP - Short program; FS - Free skating

References

Citations 

Ladies'
Women's events at the 2018 Winter Olympics
Olym